Belleisle Regional High School is a combined Middle school and  High school located in Kings County, New Brunswick. Belleisle Regional High School is in the Anglophone South School District.

See also
 List of schools in New Brunswick
 Anglophone South School District

References

Schools in Kings County, New Brunswick
High schools in New Brunswick
Middle schools in New Brunswick